Charlin is a given name and a surname. As a surname, it is derived from Charles. Notable people with the name include the following:

Surname
 André Charlin (1903–1983), French audio engineer
 Paco Charlín (bass player), member of the British pop-rock band Immaculate Fools
 Stéphane Charlin (born 2000), Swiss ice hockey player
 Manuel, María Teresa, Melchor, Yolanda, Josefa, of the Charlín surname; members of the criminal gang Os Charlins

Given name
 Charlin Vargas, Dominican beach volleyball player
 Michel Charlin Tcheumaleu (born 1975), Cameroonian soccer player
 Louise Charlin Perrin Labe (1524–1566), French poet

Fictional characters
 Manuel, Paquito, Pilar, Moncho, Leticia, of the surname Charlin, fictional characters from the Spanish TV crime drama Fariña (TV series)

See also

Carlin (name)
Chalin (disambiguation)
Chaplin (name)
Charbin (disambiguation)
Charlin (disambiguation)
Charli (name)
Charlie (given name)
Charlin (disambiguation)
Charline (name)
Charlyn